Flatonia Independent School District is a public school district based in Flatonia, Texas (USA).

The district has two campuses - Flatonia Secondary (Grades 7-12) and Flatonia Elementary (Grades K-6).

In 2009, the school district was rated "recognized" by the Texas Education Agency.

References

External links

School districts in Fayette County, Texas